Tajikistan Cricket Federation is the governing body for cricket in Tajikistan.

Administration

President:
Abdurasul Saraev (2011-2013)
Ismat Rustambekov (2013-)

General Secretary:
 Ahmad Shah Ahmadi (2013-)

Team Manager:
Naim Navobov (2013-)

Current Head Coaches:
Men's national team:   Naim Ubed (2013-)
Women's national team:   Asadullah Khan (2013-)

Development
Development Manager:
  Rasool Khan (2013-)

References

External links
 Official Facebook page

Cricket administration
Cricket in Tajikistan
Cricket
Sports organizations established in 2011